Philisidae is an extinct family of bats of the suborder Microchiroptera that lived between the Eocene to the Late Miocene in the continent of Africa.

Genera 
Currently the following genera are known:
†Dizzya Sigé, 1991
†Philisis Sigé, 1985 (type genus)
†Scotophilisis Horáček, Fejfar & Hulva, 2006
†Vampyravus Schlosser, 1910
†Witwatia Gunnell et al., 2008

References 

Bat families
Eocene first appearances
Miocene extinctions